George Eric Burroughs Dobbs (21 July 1884 – 17 June 1917) was Irish born and played international rugby union for England (2 caps as a flanker in the 1906 Home Nations Championship), and served with the British Army from 1904.  He served during the First World War, and was promoted to lieutenant colonel. He was killed at Poperinge in 1917 while surveying a cable trench when a stray artillery shell fatally wounded him. He died of wounds later that day.

References 

1884 births
1917 deaths
British military personnel killed in World War I
British Army personnel of World War I
Royal Engineers officers
British rugby union players
Rugby union flankers
People from County Kilkenny
England international rugby union players
Burials at Lijssenthoek Military Cemetery